Jay Campbell Buhner (born August 13, 1964), nicknamed "Bone", is an American former professional baseball right fielder.

Early years
Born in Louisville, Kentucky, Buhner was raised in Texas and attended Clear Creek High School in League City, southeast of Houston, where he played baseball under coach Jim Mallory. His nickname, "Bone", came after an incident where Buhner lost a ball in the lights. The ball hit him in the skull, but he shook it off. Mallory came out to see if Buhner was OK and commented it was a good thing Buhner had such a bony head, and the name stuck.

Buhner graduated from high school in 1982 and played college baseball at McLennan Community College in Waco. In his freshman season in 1983, the Highlanders made their fourth consecutive trip to the junior college world series in Grand Junction, Colorado, and won their only national title. He was selected by the Atlanta Braves in the ninth round of the 1983 Major League Baseball draft, but opted not to sign.

Minor league career
During his sophomore year in January 1984, Buhner was taken in the second round of the secondary phase of the free-agent draft by the Pittsburgh Pirates. He signed in late May and played for the Watertown Pirates in the Class A short season New York–Penn League.

That December, Buhner was traded to the New York Yankees with infielder Dale Berra as part of a five-player deal for outfielder Steve Kemp and shortstop Tim Foli, a former Pirate. His two seasons were in the Class A Florida State League with the Fort Lauderdale Yankees, then Buhner moved up to Triple A in 1987 with the Columbus Clippers in the International League and hit 31 home runs. Managed by Bucky Dent, Columbus finished second in the regular season, but swept both series in the four-team playoffs to take the league title and Governors' Cup.

Major league career
When the minor league playoffs concluded, Buhner made his major league debut in 1987 on September 11, and appeared in seven games that year. In 1988, he was back and forth between Columbus and New York, and was batting .188 (13 for 69) with three home runs in three stints for the big club when was traded on July 21 to the Seattle Mariners, along with two career minor leaguers (Rich Balabon and Troy Evers), in exchange for designated hitter Ken Phelps, a Seattle native.

The trade, often considered one of the Yankees' worst and one of the Mariners' best, was referenced on the television sitcom Seinfeld in the January 1996 episode “The Caddy”. Yankees owner George Steinbrenner appears at the home of George Costanza’s parents to mistakenly inform them that their son is dead. The only response from Frank Costanza (played by Jerry Stiller) is, “What the hell did you trade Jay Buhner for?! He had 30 home runs, over 100 RBIs last year!  He’s got a rocket for an arm… You don’t know what the hell you‘re doing!” (Steinbrenner, voiced by Larry David, replies, “Well, Buhner was a good prospect, no question about it. But my baseball people love Ken Phelps’s bat. They kept saying, ‘Ken Phelps! Ken Phelps!’”) The clip was played at Safeco Field when Buhner was inducted into the Mariners' Hall of Fame in August 2004.

Later career
Buhner's career began an upwards turn in 1991, hitting 27 home runs with 77 RBI, hitting a massive home run against his former team in Yankee Stadium in July, and having continued success against the Yankees. In an extra-inning home game against the Oakland Athletics on June 23, 1993, he became the first Mariner to hit for the cycle. Buhner began his cycle with a grand slam in the first inning, and hit a triple in the 14th inning to complete it; he subsequently scored the winning run on a wild pitch. While well known for his tendency to strike out, he also developed a patience at the plate which allowed him to walk 100 times in a season twice (1993 and 1997) and to post a career OBP of .359. By the mid-1990s he had developed into one of the premier offensive players in the game, hitting over 40 home runs in three consecutive seasons (1995, 1996, and 1997), becoming just the tenth player to do so (and the first since Frank Howard in 1970); this feat has since been equaled by several other players.

During his career, the Mariners hosted a popular promotion, "Jay Buhner Buzz Cut Night", where visitors would receive free admission in the right field seats if they had a shaved head. Free buzz cuts were provided for people who showed up with hair. Buhner himself participated in giving fans of all ages buzz cuts, which also included women. George Thorogood's song "Bad to the Bone" was used as Buhner's at-bat music during home games.

After a 116-win 2001 season, Buhner retired at age 37 in December as one of the most popular players in Mariners’ history. Although his jersey number 19 has not been issued since, it has not been officially retired, per the team's policy regarding retired numbers. The Mariners require a player to have spent at least five years with the team and be elected to the Hall of Fame or narrowly miss election after spending substantially his entire career with the team. Buhner holds the Mariners' career record for strikeouts with 1,375 and has the lowest career stolen base percentage since 1954 – 6 stolen bases against 24 times caught stealing for a success rate of 20%. (Caught stealing counts are not complete until the 1954 season, when Major League Baseball began maintaining official records.) After his playing days, Buhner and his family remained in the Seattle area, in Sammamish. His son, Gunnar, played baseball for Lewis–Clark State College, and in 2017 played for the Philadelphia Phillies' farm team in the Gulf Coast League.

See also
 List of Major League Baseball career home run leaders
 List of Major League Baseball players to hit for the cycle

References

Further reading

External links

1964 births
Living people
American expatriate baseball players in Canada
American League All-Stars
Baseball players from Louisville, Kentucky
Calgary Cannons players
Columbus Clippers players
Everett AquaSox players
Fort Lauderdale Yankees players
Gold Glove Award winners
Major League Baseball right fielders
McLennan Highlanders baseball players
New York Yankees players
People from Issaquah, Washington
People from Sammamish, Washington
Seattle Mariners announcers
Seattle Mariners players
Tacoma Rainiers players
Watertown Pirates players